Anak Ambar is a 2020 Indonesian short horror film. It was directed by Melvin Giovanie and written by Fanny Gunawan. The film tells a story about the belief of a mother who preserve the spirit of her stillbirth child (ambar child) by using attributes. Strange events begin to emerge when she temporarily stays with her eldest daughter, Mita, and Ferry, her son-in-law who does not accept her belief and disallow her to bring the ambar child's attributes into their house. The short film was released on January 15, 2020.

Cast 
Irene Sonia as Mita
Melvin Giovanie as Ferry
Wellyranti as Mama
Nissy Ariana Meinard as Mona
Qory Sandyoriva as Sasa
Levana Azzahra as Anak Ambar
Ilah Milah as Mbak Darmi

References

External links 

 Official Website
 

2020 horror films
2020 films
Indonesian ghost films
Indonesian horror films
Films set in Indonesia
Films shot in Indonesia
Indonesian supernatural horror films
2020 short films